Kabhi Na Kabhi is a 1998 Indian Hindi-language action film co-written and directed by Priyadarshan. It stars Anil Kapoor, Jackie Shroff and Pooja Bhatt. The film was produced by R. Mohan (aka GoodKnight Mohan) in the banner of a Malayalam film production company, Shogun Films. The film which began production in 1994 had a delayed release on 17 April 1998.

Plot
Kachra Seth runs an empire of collecting garbage, which is merely a front to cover-up for his other business like drug trafficking. He recruits a select group of people to carry out unpleasant tasks such as beating someone up, or even killing someone. One of his recruits is Jaggu, who will do anything for a price. Jaggu loves Tina but is afraid to tell her. When Jaggu's mother is hospitalized, he comes to Kachra for monetary assistance, he is assigned to a task instead, and unable to complete the task he is apprehended by the police with the assistance of a librarian and is subsequently found guilty and sent to prison. Jaggu's place is taken by Rajeshwar, shortly called Raja, who is also attracted to Tina and even rescues her from one of Kachra's goons, Chhabile and they fall in love. When Jaggu returns from prison, he finds his mother has died, and his sister missing, believed to have killed herself. In anger, he concocts a full-proof plan to kill the librarian, and does. Jaggu does not know the librarian is none other than Raja's father and Raja swears to hunt down his father's killer. When Kachra Seth learns of Raja and Jaggu's rivalry, he uses his goons also but when Jaggu's sister comes alive, Raja saves her from street goons, Jaggu goes on kill spree to save Raja from Kachra Seth and his goons. In the end, Jaggu dies in the arms of Raja after Raja kills Kachra Seth.

Cast

 Anil Kapoor as Rajeshwar "Raja"
 Jackie Shroff as Jaggu
 Pooja Bhatt as Tina
 Paresh Rawal as Kachra Seth
 Tinu Anand as Chhabile
 Aloknath as Rajeshwar's Father
 Rohini Hattangadi as Tina's Aunty
 Sukumari as Jaggu's Mother
 Mac Mohan as Tatya

Soundtrack
The score and soundtrack were composed by A. R. Rahman with lyrics by Javed Akhtar. This was supposed to be the first Bollywood project of Rahman which he signed before Rangeela. But due to undisclosed reasons, release of the film was delayed. Rahman reused the song "Anjali Anjali" from 1994 Tamil film Duet as "Mil Gayi Mil Gayi" as per the director's request. This is the only song sung by Kumar Sanu for A. R. Rahman.

Reviewer of Screen India said, "A. R. Rahman spins another fizzy, frothy score for this long overdue film. This is vintage Rahman — resolutely stub — born in style — yet, it makes for much pleasant listening." The soundtrack also proved popular upon release.

The official track listing:

The song "Tu Hi Tu" was remastered as "Manase Manase" in the Tamil movie Nenjinile.

Soundtrack (Hindi) - Kabhi Na Kabhi

Soundtrack (Tamil) - Monalisa

References

External links
 

1990s crime action films
1990s Hindi-language films
Films directed by Priyadarshan
Films scored by A. R. Rahman
Indian crime action films